George Musgrave (1740c. – 27 March 1824), of Kepier, co. Durham, was Member of Parliament for Carlisle  in 1768–1774.

References

1740 births
1824 deaths
British MPs 1768–1774
Members of the Parliament of Great Britain for English constituencies
Members of the Parliament of Great Britain for Carlisle